Karalan is a village in the Gercüş District of Batman Province in Turkey. The village is populated by Kurds of the Hesar tribe and had a population of 105 in 2021.

The hamlet of Esentepe is attached to the village.

References 

Villages in Gercüş District
Kurdish settlements in Batman Province